A farm crisis describes times of agricultural recession, low crop prices and low farm incomes. The most recent US farm crisis occurred during the 1980s.

Crisis of the 1920s and 1930s

A farm crisis began in the 1920s, commonly believed to be a result of high production for military needs in World War I. At the onset of the crisis, there was high market supply, high prices, and available credit for both the producer and consumer. The U.S. government continued to instill inflationary policy following World War I. By June 1920, crop prices averaged 31 percent above 1919 and 121 percent above prewar prices of 1913. Also, farm land prices rose 40 percent from 1913 to 1920. Crops of 1920 cost more to produce than any other year. Eventually, a price break began in July 1920 which squeezed farmers between both decreasing agricultural prices and steady industrial prices.  Examples of decreasing agriculture prices include: By 1933, cotton was only 5.5 cents per pound, corn was down 19.4 cents per bushel, and hogs declined to $2.94 instead of their respective 1909-1914 average prices of 12.4 cents per pound, to 83.6 cents per bushel, and $7.24 per hog. Furthermore, a region of the great plains was hit by an extreme drought which added to the agricultural difficulties of the time.

Reformation of the 1920s and 1930s

Throughout this crisis there were many attempts to form Farmers' Unions. This was difficult considering the lack of effective communication technology, the lack of electricity on many farms,  and the overall size of the country. The Agricultural Marketing Act of 1929 intended to bring government aid to cooperatives. It allowed the Federal Farm Board to make loans and other assistances in hopes of stabilizing surplus and prices. Later, Agricultural Adjustment Act (AAA), which was enacted on May 12, 1933, aimed to bring back pre World War 1 Farmers' abilities to sell farm products for the same worth they were able to buy non-farm products. The Act involved seven different crops: corn, wheat, cotton, rice, peanuts, tobacco, and milk. Farmers were paid to not plant those seven crops, thus decreasing supply and returning to market equilibrium. In order to prevent noncooperative farmers from taking advantage of other farmers decreasing supply the bill states "is to keep this noncooperation minority in line, or at least prevent it from doing harm to the majority, that the power of the Government has been marshaled behind the adjustment programs" In other words, the benefits from payments to cooperative farmers were designed to be more beneficial than being noncooperative and flooding the market. The AAA was deemed unconstitutional on January 6, 1936. Further reformation included Farm Credit Act of 1933, which allowed farmers to re-mortgage no longer affordable property, as well as the Frazier–Lemke Farm Bankruptcy Act.

1980s crisis

The United States experienced a major agricultural crisis during the 1980s. By the mid-1980s, the crisis had reached its peak.  Land prices had fallen dramatically leading to record foreclosures. 

Farm debt for land and equipment purchases soared during the 1970s and early 1980s, doubling between 1978 and 1984. Other negative economic factors included high interest rates, high oil prices (inflation) and a strong dollar. Record production led to a fall in the price of commodities. Exports fell at the same time, due in part to the 1980 United States grain embargo against the Soviet Union. The Farm Credit System experienced large losses, which were the first losses since the Great Depression. The price of farmland was a significant factor. Credit availability and inflation had contributed to an increase in the price of farm land. Demand was further bolstered by high farm incomes and capital gains on farm real estate, when many farmers expanded their existing operations. The value of farmland increased so drastically that it attracted investment from speculators.

Agricultural banks felt the impact of the crisis. There were 10 bank failures in 1981, only one of which was an agricultural bank. In 1985, the number rose to 62, of which agricultural banks accounted for over half.

See also
Agricultural economics
Farmers' suicides in the United States

References

Agricultural economics